The name Sille [pronounced Si-l:e] is a female (occasionally male) name, that is mainly used in Scandinavia. The name is thought to originate from Cecilie, a variant of Cecilia (a female version of the Roman name Caecilius), and from Sylvester.

People with the name include:
 Sille Thomsen (born 1992), Danish handball player

Scandinavian feminine given names